Alexandros Pappas  (born September 5, 1990, Indonesia) is a Swedish footballer of Greek descent currently under contract for Finnish side IFK Mariehamn.

References
 Guardian Football

External links
eurosport.se 

1978 births
Living people
Swedish footballers
Swedish expatriate footballers
Örgryte IS players
Amiens SC players
IFK Mariehamn players
Ligue 2 players
Veikkausliiga players
Expatriate footballers in France
Expatriate footballers in Finland
Association football defenders